Harvey Spencer Stephens (born 12 November 1970) is an English actor and animator. He played the role of devil child Damien Thorn in the 1976 film The Omen, which earned him a Golden Globe nomination for Best Acting Debut in a Motion Picture – Male.

Biography 

Stephens was born in Putney, London and was educated at Malory Comprehensive School (currently Haberdashers' Knights Academy), Bromley. He was four years old when picked for the part, which required him to have his blond hair dyed dark brown. In an interview with AMC, director Richard Donner said Stephens got the part after attacking the filmmaker (at Donner's urging), punching Donner in the testicles for good measure.

It was the only major film role in Stephens' career; he would later play a small role in the 1980 TV film Gauguin the Savage. He also appears in the DVD special features section of the 2006 version of The Omen, and as a tabloid journalist in the film. Interview footage of Stephens from 1996 was used in the 2005 documentary The Curse of the Omen, a programme detailing the supposed eerie coincidences surrounding the making of the film.

Stephens appeared on The Howard Stern Show on Sirius Radio on 23 April 2008 to promote a film he was working on. He said he also has started appearing at autograph signings and horror conventions "with my tricycle."

Arrest 
On 13 January 2017, Stephens was given a suspended prison sentence for a road-rage attack on two cyclists at Toys Hill, Westerham, Kent, on 21 August 2016. The court had heard that Stephens repeatedly used his horn when riders Mark Richardson and Alex Manley, who were out cycling separately, were side-by-side on the road as one overtook the other. Richardson responded by flicking his middle finger at Stephens, who then pulled over.

After getting out of his car, Stephens punched Richardson, knocking him unconscious, which prompted Manley to intervene. Stephens responded by asking Manley: “You want some, do you?” before punching him twice in the face, causing him to fall on his back with his bicycle still between his legs. Stephens then held him down and punched him six or seven times, inflicting dental injuries and damaging his helmet.

In 2017, at Maidstone Crown Court, Judge Martin Joy sentenced Stephens to 12 months in jail, suspended for two years, for causing actual bodily harm, and to two months, also suspended for two years, for criminal damage. Stephens, a resident of the High Street, Edenbridge, Kent, was ordered to undergo rehabilitation, perform 150 hours of unpaid work, pay compensation of £1,000 to each victim, and an extra £120 to Mr Manley for his damaged helmet.

Filmography 
 The Omen (1976) – Damien Thorn
 Gauguin the Savage (1980, TV Movie) – Young Emil
 The Omen (2006) – Tabloid Reporter #3

References

External links 
 

1970 births
English male child actors
English male film actors
English people convicted of assault
Living people
People from Putney